Isabella of Jerusalem refers to Isabella I of Jerusalem (1172–1205), queen regnant of the Kingdom of Jerusalem.

Isabella of Jerusalem may also refer to:

 Isabella II of Jerusalem (1212–1228), queen regnant of the Kingdom of Jerusalem
 Isabella of Cyprus (died 1265), regent to the Kingdom of Jerusalem

See also

 Sibylla, Queen of Jerusalem (1159–1190), queen of Jerusalem
 Isabella (disambiguation)